Tavia Galonski (née Baxter) is an American politician serving as a member of the Ohio House of Representatives for the 33rd District since 2017. A Democrat, she represents portions of Akron and Barberton in Summit County.

Life and career

Galonski received her bachelor's degree from Emory University in Atlanta, Georgia, and then a Juris Doctor degree from the University of Akron School of Law.  In Atlanta, Galonski worked as a flight attendant for Delta Air Lines while in school. A former Teamster, Galonski's father was a member of the United Auto Workers.

An attorney by trade, Galonski previously served as a magistrate in the Summit County Court of Common Pleas, including in the county's juvenile court. She is married to Summit County Chief Assistant Prosecutor John Galonski, and together they have two children.

Ohio House of Representatives

When former Representative Greta Johnson left the General Assembly in the spring of 2017, Galonski sought the appointment to replace her. Johnson resigned from the 35th House District to work in the Summit County Law Department as Deputy Law Director. Galonski was selected to replace Johnson by House Democrats, who had the authority to appoint a replacement, and was seated on May 10, 2017. She was elected for a full, two-year term on November 6, 2018 with 61% of the vote.

In 2020, Galonski said President Donald Trump should be tried for crimes against humanity in The Hague, the site of the International Criminal Court (ICC), for recommending the use of hydroxychloroquine as a treatment for COVID-19. However, the United States is not a member of the ICC.

References

External links
Ohio State Representative Tavia Galonski official site

Living people
Emory University alumni
University of Akron alumni
Democratic Party members of the Ohio House of Representatives
21st-century American politicians
21st-century American women politicians
Politicians from Akron, Ohio
Year of birth missing (living people)
African-American state legislators in Ohio